Brønderslev Gymnasium og HF-kursus is secondary school in Brønderslev, Denmark. The school offers gymnasium and Higher Preparatory Examination programs and has a student body of around 550.

The gymnasium was first proposed by the Brønderslev city council in 1958, though students were not admitted until 1973. The school had temporary premises at the city's former technical school until 1974, when the current premises were inaugurated. The gymnasium was originally owned and run by North Jutland County until its abolishment in 2007, and has since been independent.

Adjacent to the gymnasium's main doors, a statue called "Månedyret" (the moon animal) is displayed. The statue was donated in 1998 by its sculptor, Claus Ørntoft.

In March 2020, the campus closed due to the coronavirus pandemic. The school reopened in April 2020 with social distancing measures in place.

Rectors 
 Jesper Falsig Pedersen, 1973-1992
 Egon Jensen, 1992-2011
 Per Knudsen, 2012-present

Notable alumni 

 Hanne Vibeke Holst – Author (1977)
 Martin Bech - Politician (2009)
 Søren Kjeldsen - Golfer

References 

1973 establishments
Brønderslev
Gymnasiums in Denmark